Humberto Castro (born Humberto Jesús Castro García in 1957 in Havana, Cuba) is an important Cuban painter.

He studied at the Escuela Nacional de Bellas Artes "San Alejandro" and at the Instituto Superior de Arte (ISA) in Havana, Cuba. In 1980 he became part of the Taller Experimental de Gráfica (TEG), Havana, and from 1982 until 1985 he was also member of the Equipo de Creación Colectiva Hexágono, Havana.

Individual exhibitions 

'"Hallazgos"', in 1980, was his first individual exhibition and it took place at Teatro Mella, Havana, Cuba. In 1988 "Three Cuban Artists" in Gallery 76, Ontario College of Art/Forest City Gallery, Toronto, Ontario, Canada. Three years after this experience in North America "Humberto Castro. Jeune Peinture", Grand Palais, Paris, France. In 1993 "Humberto Castro. L'envol d'Icare". Le Monde de L'Art, Paris, France and Art 93 Chicago. The New Pier Show, Chicago, Illinois, USA. In 1995 "Le Radeau d'Ulyses". Le Monde de L'Art, París, France and "Humberto Castro. Nuevos trabajos". Galería Corine Timsit, San Juan, Puerto Rico . In 1997 "Mariano y Humberto Castro". Pan American Art Gallery, Dallas, Texas, USA.

Collectives exhibitions 

Among his collective exhibitions there is a special one in 1975 that took place at Escuela Nacional de Bellas Artes "San Alejandro", Havana.  In 1983 15th International Biennial of Graphic Art, Museum of Modern Art (Moderna Galerija), Ljubljana, Slovenia. In 1984 Eighth British International Print Biennale. Cartwright Hall, Lister Park Bradford, Bradford, United Kingdom, 1st Havana Biennial, Bienal de La Habana. Museo Nacional de Bellas Artes de La Habana, Havana, Cuba. In 1986 VII Bienal de San Juan del Grabado Latinoamericano y del Caribe. Arsenal de la Marina, San Juan, Puerto Rico, and in 1989 9 Norwegian International Print Triennale Fredrikstad [from August 10 until October 8]. Fredrikstad Bibliotek, Fredrikstad, Norway. In 1991 42é Salon de la Jeune Peinture. Grand Palais, Paris, France, and 4th Havana Biennial Bienal de La Habana. Museo Nacional de Bellas Artes de La Habana, Havana. And in 2000 "La gente en casa". Contemporary collection. 7th Havana Biennial Bienal de La Habana. Museo Nacional de Bellas Artes, Havana, CUBA.

Awards 

In 1981 he received the award Primer Premio en Grabado. Primer Salón Nacional de Pequeño Formato, Salón Lalo Carrasco, Hotel Habana Libre. In 1983 Premio Encuentro de Grabado'83. Sala Tespis, Hotel Habana Libre, Havana. On 1984 Engraving First Prize. I Trienal Internacional de Arte contra la Guerra, Museo Estatal de Majdanek, Lublin, Poland. In 1986 Award. VII Bienal de San Juan del Grabado Latinoamericano y del Caribe, Arsenal de la Marina, San Juan, Puerto Rico and finally in 1994 First Prize "Toison d'Or", Cannes, France.

Collections 

 Ambrosino Gallery's collection, Miami, Florida
 Centro de Arte Euro Americano, Caracas, Venezuela
 Fondo Cubano de Bienes Culturales, Havana, Cuba
 Galerie Le Monde de L'Art, Paris, France
 Galerie Akié Aricchi, Paris, France
 Museo de la Villa de Capo de Orlando, Sicily, Italy
 São Paulo Museum of Art, Sao Paulo, Brazil
 Museo de Arte Latinoamericano, Managua, Nicaragua
 Museo Estatal de Majdaneck, Lublin, Poland
 Museo Nacional de Bellas Artes de La Habana, Havana, Cuba
 Museum of Art Fort Lauderdale, Fort Lauderdale, Florida,
Kendall Art Center, Miami, Florida

References
	
 New Art of Cuba by Luis Camnitzer; 456 pages; Subjects: Art, Cuban 20th century; ; 
 Humberto Castro: The Paris Years; Catalog from the show of the Cuban artist Humberto Castro, Museum of Art Fort Lauderdale; ; 
 "Jose Viegas"; Memoria: Artes Visuales Cubanas Del Siglo Xx; (California International Arts 2004);   

External links

 Humberto Castro
 Virginia Miller Galleries
Cuban Avant-Garde
  Cuba Art NY
Emilio Ichikawa
  Cernuda Arte
 Cuba Encuentro Noticias
Art Nexus: Humberto Castro by Irina Leyva
Art Nexus: Humberto Castro at ArtSpace/Virginia Miller by Janet Batet
 Art Nexus: Humberto Castro by Francine Birbragher

1957 births
Living people
Cuban contemporary artists
Artists from Havana
Cuban painters
Instituto Superior de Arte alumni